Steve Starr is a Pulitzer Prize winning American photographer. He has since retired from photography, and since 2014, has served as a Third Order Franciscan Brother at Grace and St. Stephen's Episcopal Church in Colorado Springs.

Life
Starr attended San José State University, for a BA in Journalism, graduating in 1967.

He worked for the Associated Press in four bureaus, Los Angeles, New York City, Albany, NY, and Miami, FL.

"Campus Guns," his photograph of armed African American protesters leaving Willard Straight Hall at Cornell University, won the Pulitzer Prize for Spot News Photography in 1970.

He married Marilynne Starr, who he met at San José State University. He lives in Colorado Springs, Colorado. He has been writing a autobiography since 2020 about his experiences as a photojournalist and as a Franciscan Brother.

Awards
 May 4, 1970 - Pulitzer Prize for Spot News Photography

Works
Guns on Campus, 1969
Mourners at the Columbine Memorial, 1999

References

External links
 

American photographers
Living people
Pulitzer Prize for Photography winners
Year of birth missing (living people)
San Jose State University alumni